The 167th Pennsylvania House of Representatives District is in South Eastern Pennsylvania and has been represented by Kristine Howard since 2019.

District profile
The 167th Pennsylvania House of Representatives District is located in Chester County and includes the following areas: 

 Charlestown Township
 East Whiteland Township
 Easttown Township
 Malvern
 West Pikeland Township
 West Whiteland Township
 Willistown Township

Representatives

Recent election results

References

External links
District map from the United States Census Bureau
Pennsylvania House Legislative District Maps from the Pennsylvania Redistricting Commission.  
Population Data for District 44 from the Pennsylvania Redistricting Commission.

Government of Chester County, Pennsylvania
167